Bodrov and Bodrova (feminine) is a Russian surname. Notable people with the surname include:

Sergei Bodrov (born 1948), Soviet and Russian film director, screenwriter, and producer
Sergei Bodrov Jr. (1971–2002), Russian actor and son of Sergei Bodrov
Denis Bodrov (born 1986), Russian professional ice hockey defenseman
Ihor Bodrov (born 1987), Ukrainian sprinter
Yevgeni Bodrov (born 1988), Russian professional ice hockey player

Russian-language surnames